Ruins of Eldena Abbey in the Riesengebirge or Ruins in the Riesengebirge is an 1830-1834 oil on canvas painting by Caspar David Friedrich, now in the Pommersches Landesmuseum in Greifswald. It shows the ruins of the Eldena Abbey in the Riesengebirge mountains.

References

Paintings in Mecklenburg-Western Pomerania
1834 paintings
Paintings by Caspar David Friedrich